Khalid Latif is the Executive Director and Chaplain (Imam) for the Islamic Center at New York University (NYU).

In 2005, Latif was appointed the first Muslim chaplain at NYU.  In 2006, Latif was appointed the first Muslim chaplain at Princeton University. In 2007, Latif’s position was fully institutionalized at New York University, and so he committed himself to that institution and the building of a Muslim life institution.

In 2007, Mayor Michael Bloomberg nominated Latif to become the youngest chaplain in history of the New York City Police Department when he was 24 years old. Latif has developed skills as a spokesperson for co-existence, mutual understanding, and productive relationships between cultures, communities, and religions.

Latif has offered his experience to the U.S. State Department, various institutions, corporations, mosques, and other communities in the United States, Canada, Denmark, the Netherlands, Spain, and Egypt. He has been invited to speak at the University of Alabama-Birmingham, Yeshiva University, St. John's University, the University of Pennsylvania, the University of California-Davis, University of California-Berkeley, Columbia University, Princeton University, The University of Illinois (Urbana-Champaign), Ohio State University and Harvard University. Latif  has been quoted or otherwise featured in The Guardian and GEO TV. Latif was named one of the 500 most influential Muslims in the world in 2010 by Georgetown University's Prince Alwaleed Center for Muslim–Christian Understanding and The Royal Islamic Strategic Studies Centre.

In 2009, Latif was a runner-up in the FaithTrust Institute's National Sermon Contest for his sermon "Real Men Don't Hit Women".

Latif is one of the principal subjects of Chelsea Clinton's 2014 documentary film "Of Many".

Since 2010, Latif has run a daily blog for the HuffPost Religion during the Islamic holy month of Ramadan, in 2011 winning the Brass Crescent Award. He was named to the 2012 Christian Science Monitor's "30 under 30" list. In 2014, Latif was honored with the NYU Alumni Distinguished Service Award for his continued work to help bridge gaps between different faith groups.  He also owns Honest Chops.

References

External links
 Imam Khalid Shares Stage with Pope Francis
 NY Daily News NYPD Appointment
 Vox Profile
 Family Circle Feature
 NY Times Imam Khalid Feature
 Honest Chops
 New York Foundation Confronting Islam
 Daily Beast Muslim Police Officers
 Imam Khalid Welcomes Obamas Words
 Islamic Center at New York University
 Faith House Bio of Imam Latif
 America.gov article on Imam Latif

American imams
Living people
21st-century imams
Muslim chaplains
Religious leaders from New York City
Year of birth missing (living people)